The Georgian House is a historic building at 7 Great George Street, Bristol, England. It was originally built around 1790 for John Pinney, a wealthy sugar merchant and slave plantation owner, and is now furnished and displayed as a typical late 18th century town house. The period house museum includes a drawing room, eating room, study, kitchen, laundry and housekeeper's room. There is also a small display on slavery and sugar plantations. The Georgian House has been a branch of Bristol City Council since it was presented to the city as a museum in 1937.

The museum is open from 1 April to 31 December on Saturdays, Sundays, Mondays and Tuesdays, 11am-4pm. It received 32,127 visitors in 2019.

History 

The Georgian House is a well-preserved example of a typical late 18th-century town house, which has been designated by English Heritage as a grade II* listed building. It was built around 1790 for John Pinney, a sugar merchant and slave plantation owner, and is believed to be the house where the poets William Wordsworth and Samuel Taylor Coleridge first met. It was also home to the freed slave Frances Coker who was a maid and Pinney's slave, Pero, after whom Pero's Bridge at Bristol Harbour is named.

It contains some of the original furniture and fittings, such as the bureau-bookcase in the study and a rare cold water plunge bath, and has been used as a location for the BBC TV series A Respectable Trade, which was adapted from the book by Philippa Gregory, about the slave trade.

Areas of the house

The Dining Room
Pinney's Study 
The Drawing Room 
Library and a Ladies’ Withdrawing Room 
The Bedroom 
A hidden staircase 
A small lift (dumb waiter)
The Housekeeper's Room 
The cold water plunge pool

Film and media
On 5 July 2010, Amanda Vickery filmed scenes for her series At home with the Georgians at the Georgian House.

See also
The Red Lodge Museum
Bristol Museum & Art Gallery
Blaise Castle House Museum
Kings Weston House
Bristol Archives

References

External links 
 The Georgian House Museum

Historic house museums in Bristol
Houses completed in 1791
Grade II* listed houses
Grade II* listed buildings in Bristol
Georgian architecture in Bristol
Museums established in 1937
1937 establishments in England